The Neutron Time Of Flight (n-TOF) facility is a neutron spectrometer at CERN. It consists of a pulsed source, a flight path of 200 m length, and a detector systems. Neutron energies are deduced from the time of flight between source and detector; hence the name of the facility. The neutrons are produced by neutron spallation; by directing a pulsed beam of protons from the Proton Synchrotron (PS) towards a lead target about 300 neutrons expelled for each impact of a proton. The neutrons are slowed after being emitted, first by the lead target and afterwards by a slab containing water. This results in a wide range of neutron energies since some neutrons will slow down more than others when passing through the targets. Finally, the neutrons are ejected through the 200m long flight path before they arrive at an experimental area.

References

External links
n-TOF Homepage
n-TOF on INSPIRE

CERN facilities
Neutron facilities